Puerto Rico Highway 955 (PR-955) is an east–west road located entirely in the municipality of Río Grande, Puerto Rico.

Major intersections

See also

 List of highways numbered 955

References

External links
 

955
Río Grande, Puerto Rico